Adenylate-uridylate-rich elements (AU-rich elements; AREs) are found in the 3' untranslated region (UTR) of many messenger RNAs (mRNAs) that code for proto-oncogenes, nuclear transcription factors, and cytokines. AREs are one of the most common determinants of RNA stability in mammalian cells.

AREs are defined as a region with frequent adenine and uridine bases in a mRNA. They usually target the mRNA for rapid degradation.

ARE-directed mRNA degradation is influenced by many exogenous factors, including phorbol esters, calcium ionophores, cytokines, and transcription inhibitors. These observations suggest that AREs play a critical role in the regulation of gene transcription during cell growth and differentiation, and the immune response.

AREs have been divided into three classes with different sequences. The best characterised adenylate uridylate (AU)-rich Elements have a core sequence of AUUUA within U-rich sequences (for example WWWU(AUUUA)UUUW where W is A or U). This lies within a 50–150 base sequence, repeats of the core AUUUA element are often required for function.

A number of different proteins (e.g. HuA, HuB, HuC, HuD, HuR) bind to these elements and stabilise the mRNA while others (AUF1, TTP, BRF1, TIA-1, TIAR, and KSRP) destabilise the mRNA, miRNAs may also bind to some of them. HuD (also called ELAVL4) binds to AREs and increases the half-life of ARE-bearing mRNAs in neurons during brain development and plasticity.

AREsite—a database for ARE containing genes—has recently been developed with the aim to provide detailed bioinformatic characterization of AU-rich elements.

Classifications
Class I ARE elements, like the c-fos gene, have dispersed AUUUA motifs within or near U-rich regions.
Class II elements, like the GM-CSF gene, have overlapping AUUUA motifs within or near U-rich regions.
Class III elements, like the c-jun gene, are a much less well-defined class—they have a U-rich region but no AUUUA repeats.

No real ARE consensus sequence has been determined yet, and these categories are based neither on the same biological functions, nor on the homologous proteins.

Mechanism of ARE-mediated decay
AREs are recognized by RNA binding proteins such as tristetraprolin (TTP), AUF1, and Hu Antigen R (HuR). Although the exact mechanism is not very well understood, recent publications have attempted to propose the action of some of these proteins. AUF1, also known as hnRNP D, binds AREs through RNA recognition motifs (RRMs). AUF1 is also known to interact with the translation initiation factor eIF4G and with poly(A)-binding protein, indicating that AUF1 senses the translational status of mRNA and decays accordingly through the excision of the poly(A) tail.

TTP's expression is rapidly induced by insulin. Immunoprecipitation experiments have shown that TTP co-precipitates with an exosome, suggesting that it helps recruit exosomes to the mRNA containing AREs. Alternatively, HuR proteins have a stabilizing effect—their binding to AREs increases the half-life of mRNAs. Similar to other RNA-binding proteins, this class of proteins contain three RRMs, two of which are specific to ARE elements. A likely mechanism for HuR action relies on the idea that these proteins compete with other proteins that normally have a destabilizing effect on mRNAs. HuRs are involved in genotoxic response—they accumulate in the cytoplasm in response to UV exposure and stabilize mRNAs that encode proteins involved in DNA repair.

Disease
Problems with mRNA stability have been identified in viral genomes, cancer cells, and various diseases. Research shows that many of these problems arise because of faulty ARE function. Some of these problems have been listed below:
 The c-fos gene produces a transcription factor that is activated in several cancers, and it lacks the ARE elements.
 c-myc gene, also responsible for producing transcription factors found in several cancers, has also been reported to lack the ARE elements.
 The Cox-2 gene catalyses the production of prostaglandins—it overexpresses in several cancers, and is stabilized by the binding of CUGBP2 RNA-binding protein to ARE

References

External links
Review of original publication discovering AU-rich elements
Pillars link to original 1986 Cell publication discovering AU-rich elements
mRNA Translational blockade by AU-rich elements
Brief introduction to mRNA regulatory elements
ARED: AU-rich element database
Transterm page for AU-Rich Element
AREsite: An online resource for the analysis of AREs

RNA
Gene expression
Cis-regulatory RNA elements